Horridus may refer to:

 Horridus (comics), a fictional superheroine in The Savage Dragon comics series
 Triceratops horridus, a dinosaur species
 Crotalus horridus, scientific name for the timber rattlesnake